
John Joseph Cassidy (born 1963) is an American journalist and British expatriate who is a staff writer at The New Yorker.  He is a contributor to The New York Review of Books, and previously, an editor at The Sunday Times of London and a deputy editor at the New York Post.

Background and education 
Cassidy received his undergraduate degree from University College, Oxford, studied at Harvard University on a Harkness Fellowship, and received a master's degree in journalism from Columbia University and a master's in economics from New York University.

Economics writing
Cassidy is the author of the well-received Dot.con: The Greatest Story Ever Sold, which examines the dot-com bubble, and How Markets Fail: The Logic of Economic Calamities, which combines a skeptical history of economics with an analysis of the housing bubble and credit bust. He is also well known for his biographical and economic writing on the famous Cambridge economist John Maynard Keynes, whom he interprets in a largely positive light.

Bibliography

Books
 Dot.con : the greatest story ever sold (2002)
 How markets fail : the logic of economic calamities (2009)

Essays and reporting

Blog posts
 
———————
Notes and full bibliographic citations

References

External links

English male journalists
Living people
The New Yorker staff writers
1963 births
Harkness Fellows
Alumni of University College, Oxford
New York University alumni
Columbia University Graduate School of Journalism alumni
Writers from Leeds
English male non-fiction writers
English cricketers
Oxford University cricketers
People educated at Cardinal Heenan Catholic High School, Leeds